The 1904 Baylor football teamwas an American football team that represented Baylor University as an independent during the 1903 college football season. In its first season under head coach Sol Metzger, the team compiled a 2–5–1 record and was outscored by a total of 106 to 34.

Metzger was brought to Baylor following successes with his previous football teams as both player and captain.  At Andover, "the leading preparatory school of the East" at the time, he played two years of football.  He subsequently attended the University of Pennsylvania, where he was selected as captain of the freshman football team; after two years of varsity football, the senior was selected as captain of the varsity team and graduated with honor from Penn.

In March 1904, the Southwestern Intercollegiate Athletic Association was formed, encompassing:

"the States of Texas, Arkansas, Missouri, Kansas, Colorado and the Territories of New Mexico, Oklahoma and the Indian Territory.  Nearly every important institution within this district is either now a member or has signified its intention of joining in the near future."

Following the season, Lester, a right tackle for Baylor, was selected to the All Southwestern football team as a substitute, and center Townes was noted as the greatest rival in the Southwest to Texas's center Glascock.

Schedule

References

Baylor
Baylor Bears football seasons
Baylor football